Andrew La Grone (born November 4, 1990) is a lawyer and a former member of the Nebraska Legislature.

Early life
La Grone was born on November 4, 1990 in Omaha, Nebraska.

Education
La Grone graduated from Millard South High School in 2009. La Grone earned a B.A. from the University of Nebraska-Lincoln in 2012 and a J.D. with high distinction from the University of Nebraska College of Law in 2015.

Career
La Grone is a lawyer and a member of the Nebraska State Bar Association. Between his undergraduate years and law school, La Grone served as a staff assistant in the Washington, D.C. office of U.S. Congressman Adrian Smith in 2013.

On January 9, 2019, La Grone was appointed by the governor to the Nebraska Legislature after his predecessor, John Murante, was elected as Treasurer of Nebraska. La Grone represented the 49th district from his appointment to January 2021. La Grone is a Republican.

La Grone ran for election to a full term in the 2020 election. He lost the primary election to business-owner and Democrat Jen Day 53.1% to 46.9%. His campaign sent out a mailer criticizing Day featuring a photo of a volunteer and not the candidate herself. La Grone was defeated by Day in the November 2020 general election.

Personal life
La Grone is Catholic. He married fellow state senator Julie Slama in December 2021.

References

External links

Living people
1990 births
Catholics from Nevada
Politicians from Omaha, Nebraska
University of Nebraska–Lincoln alumni
Republican Party Nebraska state senators
Nebraska lawyers
21st-century American politicians
21st-century American lawyers